Oxford is a city in Calhoun, Talladega, and Cleburne counties in the State of Alabama. The population was 22,069 at the 2020 census,. Oxford is one of two principal cities of and included in the Anniston-Oxford Metropolitan Statistical Area, and it is the largest city in Calhoun County by population.

History
Founded in the early 1850s, Oxford was the first city in Calhoun County to be incorporated, in 1852. The name "Oxford" was due to the presence of a narrow crossing of Chocolocco Creek that allowed farmers to ford cattle from one side of the creek to the other. Since 1970, Oxford has annexed large amounts of land to the south and west, including the communities of Coldwater and Bynum. In 1970, it was all in Calhoun County, but today it includes areas in Talladega County and Cleburne County.

A smaller municipality, Hobson City, was once a part of Oxford. The area, then known as the Mooree Quarter, is one square mile, and is located north and west of Oxford, and south and west of Anniston. The new town became incorporated on August 16, 1899, as Hobson City, taking the name of a naval hero of the Spanish–American War.  Another result was the creation of only the second town in the United States (after Eatonville, Florida) with 100% black government, and an almost 100% black population (at least at first).

Geography

Oxford lies among the foothills at the southern end of the Blue Ridge Mountains. Nearby Cheaha Mountain is Alabama's highest point and offers expansive views of the surrounding wilderness and the city below. Much of the city's southern border is shared with the Talladega National Forest.

Major bodies of water include Oxford Lake, Choccolocco Park Lake, Lake Hillabee, Snow Creek, and the Choccolocco Creek that bisects the city.

Oxford is located mainly in the southern part of Calhoun County and is located along Interstate 20, which runs through the southern part of the city, with access from exits 179, 185, 188, and 191. U.S. Route 78 also runs through the city and connects it to Cleburne County, paralleling I-20. Alabama State Route 21 connects the city with the city of Talladega, which is southwest .

Climate
According to the Köppen climate classification, Oxford has a humid subtropical climate (abbreviated Cfa).

Demographics

2020 census

As of the 2020 United States census, there were 22,069 people, 7,871 households, and 5,604 families residing in the city.
As of the census of 2020, there were 22,069 people, 8,072 households, and 5,955 families residing in the city.

There were 8,072 households, out of which 32.2% had children under the age of 18 living with them, 55.4% were married couples living together, 13.9% had a female householder with no husband present, and 26.2% were non-families. 22.6% of all households were made up of individuals, and 9.2% had someone living alone who was 65 years of age or older. The average household size was 2.61 and the average family size was 3.05.

In the city, the population was spread out, with 25.2% under the age of 18, 8.0% from 18 to 24, 26.8% from 25 to 44, 26.7% from 45 to 64, and 13.3% who were 65 years of age or older. The median age was 37.8 years. For every 100 females, there were 93.0 males. For every 100 females age 18 and over, there were 96.0 males.

The median income for a household in the city was $57,887, and the median income for a family was $53,612. Males had a median income of $46,008 versus $30,231 for females. The per capita income for the city was $27,568. About 10.8% of families and 13.4% of the population were below the poverty line, including 22.3% of those under age 18 and 7.4% of those age 65 or over.

Economy
The city's growth in recent years can be attributed mainly to the presence of Interstate 20 and Oxford's central location between Atlanta and Birmingham. The Quintard Mall is the only fully enclosed shopping mall between Birmingham and Douglasville, Georgia. Several other shopping centers dot the landscape of Oxford with the most recent being the construction of the Oxford Commons which is just off exit 188 on Interstate 20.

Arts and culture
 Oxford Performing Arts Center
 Quintard Mall

Government
Oxford features a mayor-council form of government, though the mayor actually dictates the daily running of the city. Alton Craft is the current mayor, having succeeded former Mayor Leon Smith, whose mayorship began in 1984 and retired from office after his eighth term in 2016. Craft previously served as the Finance Director of Oxford for over two decades. The five-member council includes Phil Gardner (Place 1), Charlotte Hubbard (Place 2), Mike Henderson (Place 3), Chris Spurlin (Place 4, Council President), and Steven Waits (Place 5, Council President Pro Tempore). The mayor and city council members are elected to four-year terms that coincided with presidential election years. In 2021, a bill was passed in the Alabama legislature that moved many municipal elections, including Oxford's, to non-presidential election years. The next election will be in 2025 and will then be held every four years.

Education
Oxford's public schools are administered by the Oxford City School System. There are four elementary schools, one middle school, and one high school. A new Oxford High School building opened in August 2010, as well as a new Technical Building.

Media
 WTBJ-FM 91.3 (Christian Radio)
 WTDR-FM 92.7 (Country)
 WVOK-FM 97.9 (Adult Contemporary)
 WVOK-AM 1580 (Oldies)
 WEAC-CD TV 24 (Television Broadcast Station)
 The Anniston Star (25,000 circulation daily newspaper)
 Oxford Independent (weekly newspaper)
 Insight (a bi-monthly entertainment and event paper serving Oxford and Calhoun county)

Infrastructure

Transportation
Major highways passing through Oxford include:

 Interstate 20
 U.S. Highway 78 (Hamric Drive)
 U.S. Highway 431 (Leon Smith Parkway from I-20 northward)
 State Route 21 (Quintard Drive)
 State Route 202

Law enforcement
The city maintains a 64-member police department. The agency is divided into Uniform Division, Criminal Investigation Division, Administrative Division. The agency also has several specialized units including Special Investigations Division, Emergency Services Unit, Traffic Homicide Unit, Aviation Unit, and Honor Guard.

Notable people
Kwon Alexander, NFL, New Orleans Saints
The Bridges, folk rock band
K. J. Britt, NFL, Tampa Bay Buccaneers 
Rick Burgess, half of the nationally syndicated radio program Rick and Bubba
Asa Earl Carter, Ku Klux Klan leader, segregationist speech writer, and later famed western novelist
Tae Davis, NFL, Cleveland Browns
Trae Elston, NFL, Miami Dolphins
Chris Hammond, former Major League Baseball pitcher
Terry Henley, former Auburn University and National Football League running back
Vic Henley, professional comedian
Maud McLure Kelly, first woman lawyer in Alabama
Lash LeRoux, cartoonist and former professional wrestler
Bobby McCain, NFL, Miami Dolphins
Felton Snow, baseball player in the Negro leagues
Jackson Stephens, Major League Pitcher Atlanta Braves
Jim Stephens, former Major League Baseball catcher
Roc Thomas, NFL, Minnesota Vikings

References

External links
 City of Oxford official website

 
Cities in Alabama
Cities in Calhoun County, Alabama
Cities in Talladega County, Alabama
African-American history of Alabama